Leonard George Lowry (1884 – 21 November 1947) was a New Zealand politician of the Labour Party.

Biography

Early life and career
He was born in London in 1884. He entered the Civil Service but resigned so that he could travel abroad, settling in Lower Hutt in 1906. Before the First World War, he worked for Wellington City Council. During the war, he was on active service overseas until 1918. He was offered a job with the New Zealand Defence Force on his return, but declined, instead becoming a bookseller in Ōtaki. He remained in the job of bookseller until his death.

Political career

While living in Ōtaki, he was a member on various boards: the Borough Council, the Licensing Committee, and the Fire Board. In 1935, he was elected member of Parliament for Otaki, and again in 1938. Between the years of 1943 and 1945, he was the Chairman of the Maori Affairs Committee of the House. He retired from Parliament in 1946.

Death
He died on 21 November 1947 while on a family holiday to Auckland.

References

External links
 

1884 births
1947 deaths
New Zealand Labour Party MPs
Members of the New Zealand House of Representatives
New Zealand MPs for North Island electorates
New Zealand booksellers